"Wealth", more commonly known as "The Gospel of Wealth", is an article written by Andrew Carnegie in June of 1889 that describes the responsibility of philanthropy by the new upper class of self-made rich. The article was published in the North American Review, an opinion magazine for America's establishment. It was later published as "The Gospel of Wealth" in the Pall Mall Gazette.

Carnegie proposed that the best way of dealing with the new phenomenon of wealth inequality was for the wealthy to utilize their surplus means in a responsible and thoughtful manner (similar to the concept of noblesse oblige). This approach was contrasted with traditional bequest (patrimony), where wealth is handed down to heirs, and other forms of bequest e.g. where wealth is willed to the state for public purposes. Benjamin Soskis, a historian of philanthropy, refers to the article as the 'urtext' of modern philanthropy.

Carnegie argued that surplus wealth is put to best use (i.e. produces the greatest net benefit to society) when it is administered carefully by the wealthy. Carnegie also argues against wasteful use of capital in the form of extravagance, irresponsible spending, or self-indulgence, instead promoting the administration of said capital over the course of one's lifetime toward the cause of reducing the stratification between the rich and poor. As a result, the wealthy should administer their riches responsibly and not in a way that encourages "the slothful, the drunken, the unworthy".

At the age of 35, Carnegie decided to limit his personal wealth and donate the surplus to benevolent causes. He was determined to be remembered for his good deeds rather than his wealth. He became a "radical" philanthropist. Prior to publishing his ideas about wealth, he began donating to his favorite causes, starting by donating a public bath to his hometown of Dunfermline. As Carnegie tried to live his life in a way that the poor could benefit from his wealth, he decided he needed to share his ideas with the public.

Assertions 

The Gospel of Wealth asserts that hard work and perseverance lead to wealth.

Carnegie based his philosophy on the observation that the heirs of large fortunes frequently squandered them in riotous living rather than nurturing and growing them. Even bequeathing one's fortune to charity was no guarantee that it would be used wisely, due to the fact that there was no guarantee that a charitable organization not under one's direction would use the money in accordance with one's wishes. Carnegie disapproved of charitable giving that  maintained the poor in their impoverished state, and urged a movement toward the creation of a new mode of giving that would create opportunities for the beneficiaries of the gift to better themselves. As a result, the gift would not be simply consumed, but would be productive of even greater wealth throughout the house.

In "The Gospel of Wealth", Carnegie examines the modes of distributing accumulated wealth and capital to the communities from which they originate.  He preached that ostentatious living and amassing private treasures were wrong.  He praised the high British taxes on the estates of dead millionaires, remarking that "By taxing estates heavily at death the State marks its condemnation of the selfish millionaire's unworthy life. It is desirable that nations should go much further in this direction."

Carnegie made it clear that the duty of the rich was to live modest lifestyles, and that any surplus of money they had was best suited for re-circulation back into society where it could be used to support the greater good. He shunned aristocratic chains of inheritance and argued that dependents should be supported by their work with major moderation, with the bulk of excess wealth to be spent on enriching the community. In cases where excess wealth was held until death, he advocated its apprehension by the state on a progressive scale: "Indeed, it is difficult to set bounds to the share of a rich man's estates which should go at his death to the public through the agency of the State, and by all means such taxes should be granted, beginning at nothing upon moderate sums to dependents, and increasing rapidly as the amounts swell, until of the millionaire's hoard, at least the other half comes to the privy coffer of the State.".

Reception 
When Carnegie Steel busted the union in 1892, Carnegie was able to keep himself from blame because he focused on his new doctrine for the wealthy. The Homestead Strike ended in a showdown between 300 Pinkerton guards and a crowd of steel workers and supporters devolved into an exchange of gunfire. This outbreak left seven workers and three guards dead, and many more wounded. It made headlines around the world, and reporters reached Carnegie, who was in Scotland at the time. When questioned, Carnegie called the violence "deplorable" but otherwise pleaded ignorance, and stated "I have given up all active control of the business." This move kept him innocent, and he began to focus on his philanthropic work and teaching the Gospel of Wealth. Largely as a result of said philanthropic work, the Homestead Strike did little to mar his reputation.

Carnegie's controversial views on wealth sparked a trans-Atlantic debate that argued the nature, purpose, and disposition of wealth.

William Ewart Gladstone 
William Ewart Gladstone, the head of the Liberal Party in England, and a friend of Carnegie's, had some sharp remarks on the publication. Even though they were close friends and had similar political ideals, Gladstone did not agree with Carnegie's paper. Gladstone defended primogeniture, unlimited inheritance, and the British Aristocracy. This led to many other critics joining Gladstone in denouncing Carnegie's "radical" philanthropic ways.

These critical reviews led Carnegie to publish a series of essays defending himself. He defended individualism, private property, and the accumulation of personal wealth on the grounds that they benefited the human race in the long run. In an effort to convince his critics that he wasn't saying everyone should get free handouts from the upper class, he edited his original doctrine, so that it read "Help those who will help themselves, to provide part of the means by which those who desire to improve may do so." Since many interpreted his writing to mean that all those in poverty should be assisted by the wealthy, it was necessary for Carnegie to clarify that charity has its limitations.

Phoebe Apperson Hearst's "Gospel of Wealth" 
In 1901, U.S. Senator Jonathan Prentiss Dolliver wrote an article for the celebrity magazine Success, titled "Phoebe Apperson Hearst and the New Gospel of Wealth".  Hearst was an American philanthropist and suffragist. According to Dolliver, Hearst saw inadequacies of public schools and was concerned about urban poverty and vice. She, like Carnegie, believed that as a millionairess, it was her duty to help those less fortunate. The purpose of Dolliver's article was to explain Hearst's "Gospel of Wealth" and illustrate how she should be viewed as a complementary equal to men like Carnegie. She declared that women who were wealthy had a sacred and moral duty to give away their fortunes to causes, especially progressive education and reform, to benefit their communities. Like Carnegie, Hearst was very concerned with giving the lower class the opportunity to be educated at the same level at which the upper class was educated. Also like Carnegie, she established her own free public library. Hers was located in Anaconda, Montana.

Impact on philanthropy 

Carnegie put his philosophy into practice through a program of gifts to endow public libraries, known as 'Carnegie libraries' in cities and towns throughout the United States and the English-speaking world, with the idea that he was thus providing people with the tools to better themselves. In order to ensure that his gifts would not be wasted, he stipulated that the municipality must pass an ordinance establishing a tax to support the library's ongoing operating costs after the initial grant provided the costs for building and equipping the library. Each of these organizations had its own endowment and its own board of trustees. Many of them still exist today.

After several communities squandered their grants on extravagant buildings, Carnegie established a system of architectural guidelines that mandated simplicity and functionality. When it became obvious that Carnegie could not give away his entire fortune within his lifetime, he established the Carnegie Corporation to continue his program of giving.

See also 

 The Giving Pledge
 Gospel of success

References

External links 

 Wealth, by Andrew Carnegie, North American Review Vol.148, Issue 391 pp. 653–665, June 1889. (Later published as Part I of The Gospel of Wealth)
 
 The Best Fields for Philanthropy, by Andrew Carnegie, North American Review Vol.149, Issue 397 pp. 682–699, December 1889. (Later published as Part II of The Gospel of Wealth)
 Excerpts from "Wealth" by Andrew Carnegie, North American Review, 148, no. 391 (June 1889)
 Carnegie, Andrew South American View, 223 no. 876 (October 1982)
 Carnegie, Andrew. The Gospel of Wealth and Other Timely Essays. New York: The Century Co, 1901.

1889 essays
Philanthropy
Andrew Carnegie
1889 documents